Terrell Foster Carver (born 4 September 1946) is a Professor of Political Theory at the University of Bristol.

Career 

Carver was born in Boise, Idaho. After receiving his B.A. from Columbia University in 1968, Carver went on to study in England. After finishing his BPhil (1970) and DPhil (1975) at Oxford University, he worked as a lecturer at the University of Liverpool between 1974 and 1979. In 1980 he moved to the University of Bristol, where he was a lecturer until 1990, when he became a reader. In 1985/86 he was visiting professor at Virginia Commonwealth University. In 1991 he was both a visiting fellow at The Research School of Social Sciences of the Australian National University and also at the Centre for Asian and Pacific Studies, Seikei University, Tokyo. In 1995 Carver was appointed professor of political theory at the Department of Politics at the University of Bristol. Carver has also been visiting fellow sponsored by the Japan Society for the Promotion of Science, Tokyo/Kyoto, in 1999; a visiting professor at Pitzer College of the Claremont Colleges in 2003; and visiting professor at Senshu University, Tokyo, in 2006.

Research interests 

Carver is a political theorist taking a textual, hermeneutic and postmodern approach to classic texts and problems. His longstanding interest is in analysis and translation of works by Karl Marx and Friedrich Engels, and the relation of those studies to Marxism and the Marxist tradition in social thought and methodology of the social sciences. He has also taken an interest in feminist theories of sex, gender and sexuality, and the relation of that work to the sociology of masculinities, using this approach to reinterpret the 'malestream' canon of classic philosophers. He co-general-edits a book series on globalization. His books and articles have been translated into German, French, Japanese, Korean and Chinese.

Awards and responsibilities 

Since 1995 Carver has been a member of the Editorial Commission of the Marx-Engels Gesamtausgabe. Both in 1995/96 and in 2004/5 he was awarded a University of Bristol Research Fellowship. In 2002/3 he received the Arts and Humanities Research Board Research leave award, and again from the Arts and Humanities Research Council in 2005/6. Carver is also a member of the Political Studies Association Executive Committee. He served as Chair of the Publications Committee (2000–02), Chair of the Grants & Awards Committee (2003–05) and as Chair of the External Relations Committee (2005- ).

Books 
Karl Marx: Texts on Method (1975)
The Logic of Marx (ed.) (1980)
Engels (‘Past Masters’) (1981, repr. 1991; Japanese trans. 1989; Korean trans. 2000; reissued as Engels: A Very Short Introduction, 2003)
Marx’s Social Theory (1982)
Marx and Engels: The Intellectual Relationship (1983; Japanese trans. 1995)
Marx and Engels: A Conceptual Concordance (1983)
A Marx Dictionary (1987; Japanese trans. 1991)
Marx’s ‘Grundrisse’ and Hegel’s ‘Logic’ (ed.) (1988; German trans. 1994)
Friedrich Engels: His Life and Thought (1989, repr. 1991)
The Cambridge Companion to Marx (ed.) (1991)
 with Paul Thomas: Rational Choice Marxism: Assessments (ed.) (1995)
Cambridge Texts in the History of Political Thought: Marx, Later Political Writings (ed.) (1996)
Gender is not a Synonym for Woman (1996)
Interpreting the Political: New Methodologies (ed.) (1997)
The Postmodern Marx (1998)
The Politics of Sexuality (ed.) (1998)
Engels After Marx (ed.) (1999)
Engels: A Very Short Introduction (2003)
Men in Political Theory (2004)
Palgrave Advances in Continental Political Thought (ed.) (2006)
Judith Butler and Political Theory: Troubling Politics (with Samuel A. Chambers) (2008)
Judith Butler's Precarious Politics: Critical Reflections (ed.) (2008)
Political Language and Metaphor: Interpreting and Changing the World (ed.) (2008)
William E. Connolly: Democracy, Pluralism and Political Theory (ed.) (2008)

References

External links 
Terrell Carver's University homepage
List of publications (links to IRIS publications database)

1946 births
Living people
American political philosophers
Columbia University alumni
Marxist theorists
Alumni of the University of Oxford
People from Boise, Idaho
Academics of the University of Bristol
American expatriate academics
Academics of the University of Liverpool
American expatriates in the United Kingdom
British Marxists